"We Can Make it Together" is a song written by Alan Osmond, Merrill Osmond, and Wayne Osmond and performed by Steve and Eydie featuring The Osmonds.

The song was originally performed by Donny Osmond and was titled "Do You Want Me (We Can Make It Together)", and appeared on the 1971 album To You with Love, Donny. 

It was renamed "We Can Make It Together" and the Steve & Eydie  version was featured on their 1972 album, The World Of Steve & Eydie.  Their version reached #7 on the U.S. adult contemporary chart, #21 on Canadian adult contemporary chart, #60 on the Canadian pop chart, and #68 on the Billboard chart in 1972.  Their version was produced by Don Costa and Mike Curb and arranged by Costa.

After the song became a hit in late 1972, Osmond's version was also included on a second LP, My Best to You. The song was again retitled, "We Can Make It Together (Do You Want Me?)" to distinguish it from a different song by Osmond with a very similar title, "Do You Want Me" on his subsequent 1973 LP, Alone Together.

References

External links
 Lyrics of this song
 
 

1971 songs
1971 singles
1972 singles
The Osmonds songs
Donny Osmond songs
Steve Lawrence songs
Eydie Gormé songs
MGM Records singles
Songs written by Alan Osmond
Songs written by Merrill Osmond
Songs written by Wayne Osmond
Song recordings produced by Michael Lloyd
Song recordings produced by Mike Curb
Male–female vocal duets